This is a list of Roman triumphal arches. Triumphal arches were constructed across the Roman Empire and are an archetypal example of Roman architecture. Most surviving Roman arches date from the Imperial period (1st century BC onwards). They were preceded by honorific arches set up under the Roman Republic.

Existing arches

Destroyed arches
Note: MUR stands for the 12th century Mirabilia Urbis Romae

See also

List of post-Roman triumphal arches
Victory column
Rostral column
Roman architecture
Roman engineering
Roman technology

Sources

 
Triumphal arches